Peacock Alley was a restaurant housed in the Fitzwilliam Hotel at St. Stephen’s Green, Dublin, County Dublin, Ireland from 1999 to 2002. Before that, its location was on Baggot Street in South William Street.

It was a fine dining restaurant that was awarded one Michelin star in 1998 and retained that rating  until it closed in 2002.

The head chef of Peacock Alley was Conrad Gallagher.

Kevin Thornton bought the Peacock Alley in 2002, after the Fitzwilliam Hotel had cancelled the lease with Gallagher. He renamed the restaurant Thornton's Restaurant.

See also
List of Michelin starred restaurants in Ireland

References

Restaurants in Dublin (city)
Michelin Guide starred restaurants in Ireland
Defunct restaurants in Ireland